University series may refer to:

 Allen Drury's University series, a trilogy of novels written between 1990 and 1998
 Western University Games Series, a multi-sport competition among Western Australian universities
 List of Sweet Valley University novels by Francine Pascal